Menjab-e Jadid (also romanized as Menjāb-e Jadīd; also known as Menjāv-e Jadīd) is a village in Dodangeh Rural District, Hurand District, Ahar County, East Azerbaijan Province, Iran. At the 2006 census, its population was 50, in 12 families.

References 

Populated places in Ahar County